Lowenna is a Cornish and Welsh feminine name, meaning Happiness and Joy. Some similar names are Rowena, Wendy, Louise, and Louie. Lowenna is a rare name, with only 17,000 holders in 2020. A famous Lowenna is Lowenna Melrose, an actress.

European feminine given names